Utricularia meyeri is a medium-sized, probably perennial carnivorous plant that belongs to the genus Utricularia. It is endemic to western Goias and eastern Mato Grosso in central Brazil. It was originally described by Robert Knud Friedrich Pilger in 1901 and later reduced to synonymy under U. erectiflora by Peter Taylor in 1967. He later reevaluated his decision on the basis of scanning electron microscope images of the seed of the two species.

See also 
 List of Utricularia species

References 

meyeri
Carnivorous plants of South America
Endemic flora of Brazil
Flora of Goiás